Ismail Ali Ogama (born 1 April 1985) is a Ugandan social scientist, certified Project Management Professional and politician. He is the elected Member of Parliament for Lower Madi County, Arua District, and a representative for NRM, the ruling political party in Uganda. He is a member of the NRM Parliamentary Caucus and serves on the Committee on Public Service and Local Government in the 10th Parliament of Uganda. He lost to  Afidra Olema Ronald in the 2021-2026 Parliamentary Elections.

See also 
Arua District
National Resistance Movement
West Nile sub-region

References

External links 
 Website of the Parliament of Uganda

Living people
1985 births
Members of the Parliament of Uganda
People from Arua District
People from Northern Region, Uganda
Active politicians
Makerere University alumni
Madi people
People from West Nile sub-region
21st-century Ugandan politicians